Thong Khon  (born 23 November 1951) is a Cambodian politician. He is a member of the Cambodian People's Party and was elected to represent Kampong Thom Province in the National Assembly in 2003. Thong Khon is the current Minister of Tourism.

On 22 June 2016, on the rostrum of World Best Tourist Destination award for Cambodia he announced a new tourism policy for the Kingdom targeting 7 million tourists arrivals per year until 2020.

The main features of the Kingdom New Tourism Policy are based on promoting Angkor Wat and Angkor Thom as special cultural destination coupled with promoting the seafront of Cambodia for leisure and sea-related activities.

References

1951 births
Members of the National Assembly (Cambodia)
Cambodian People's Party politicians
Living people
Government ministers of Cambodia
Governors of Phnom Penh